Tomás Benjamín Aceval Marín (1845 – July 25, 1900) was a Paraguayan statesman, educator and diplomat.

Career
He spent most of his youth in Argentina, where he finished his law studies in 1873.

1874 he was minister of justice in the Government of Juan Bautista Gill.

From  to  he was Minister Plenipotentiary in special mission in Washington, D.C. and represented the government of Higinio Uriarte in the Chaco Boreal dispute with Argentina, after the Paraguayan War, to the President of the U.S.A. Rutherford B. Hayes. In his arbitration, Hayes awarded the region to Paraguay.

From March 1879 to 1886 he was rector of the Colegio Nacional de la Capital.

In 1886, he was foreign minister in the Government of Patricio Escobar.

On  he negotiated with the Bolivian plenipotentiary Isaac Tamayo, the abortive Aceval-Tamayo Treaty.

He was Minister of Finance of Paraguay from 1895 to 1897.

He died of Bubonic plague, amidst an epidemic that hit Asuncion.

Benjamín Aceval, a town in the Department of Presidente Hayes in Paraguay is named in his honor.

References

1845 births
1900 deaths
Ambassadors of Paraguay to the United States
Foreign Ministers of Paraguay
Finance Ministers of Paraguay